Buckwild may refer to:
 Buckwild (music producer), American hip hop producer
 Buckwild (TV series), an American reality television series 
 Buck Wild, a 2013 comedy horror film
 Buck Wild (song), a 1989 song by Experience Unlimited